Giovanni Maria Pagliardi (1637–1702) was an Italian composer. He became de facto maestro di cappella at Florence Cathedral from 1690, but did not formally gain the title till the death of his predecessor, Pietro Sammartini.

Works
L'innocenza trionfante, oratorio performed at Ss Annunziata, Genoa in 1660
Il Caligola delirante, 3-act opera at Teatro SS Giovanni e Paolo in Venice; Giovanni Maria Pagliardi, libretto Domenico Gisberti - 1672 Venice, restaged 1680
Lisimaco, text by Ivanovich 1673
Numa Pompilio 1674, Venice
Lo speziale di villa, Florence - probably not originally by Pagliardi
Il finto chimico 1686, Florence
Il pazzo per forza 1687, Pratolino, Florence
Il tiranno di Colco 1688
La serva favorita 1689
Il Greco in Troia 1689
Attilio Regolo 1693

Recordings
Caligula (DVD) selections from the opera - puppet staging [80' min] by Mimmo Cuticchio and his puppet troop L'Opera dei Pupi; with music by Jan van Elsacker, Caroline Meng, Florian Götz, Jean-Francois Lombard, Sophie Junker, Serge Gougioud, Le Poeme Harmonique, Vincent Dumestre Alpha 2018

References

1637 births
1702 deaths